Alessandro Franly Baroni Vásquez (born 14 August 1999) is a Dominican footballer who plays as a goalkeeper for Liga Dominicana de Fútbol club O&M FC and the Dominican Republic national team.

Career

Baroni started his career with the reserves of Portuguese top flight side Boavista.

Before the 2019 season, he signed for O&M in the Dominican Republic.

References

External links
 
 Alessandro Baroni at playmakerstats.com

1999 births
Living people
Sportspeople from Santo Domingo
Dominican Republic footballers
Association football goalkeepers
Dominican Republic expatriate footballers
Dominican Republic expatriate sportspeople in Portugal
Expatriate footballers in Portugal
Dominican Republic people of Italian descent